Gap Gold: The Best of The Gap Band is a greatest hits album by American group The Gap Band. It was released in March 1985 on Total Experience Records. The album contains most of their commercially successful singles from 1979–1983.

Commercial performance 
Gap Gold peaked at number 103 on the US Billboard 200. the album was certified platinum by the Recording Industry Association of America (RIAA) for selling 1 million copies in the United States.

Track listing 
Side one
Burn Rubber (Why You Wanna Hurt Me) – 5:16
Outstanding – 3:18
I Don't Believe You Want To Get Up And Dance (Oops) – 8:31
Party Train – 5:58
Stay With Me – 4:10

Side two
You Dropped A Bomb On Me – 5:10
Early In The Morning – 6:28
Yearning For Your Love – 5:41
Shake – 4:57
Season's No Reason To Change – 4:47

Charts

Certifications

References 

1985 greatest hits albums
The Gap Band albums
Total Experience Records albums